Rhythm Formula is the sixth studio album by J-pop duo Two-Mix, released by WEA Japan on November 25, 1999. It includes the singles "Truth (A Great Detective of Love)" (episode 124–142 opening theme of the anime TV series Case Closed), "Body Makes Stream" (theme song of the TBS sports program Super Soccer), and "Maximum Wave" (commercial theme for SSAWS), as well as the song "Last Tears (I Don't Cry Anymore, After You Left Me...)" (the first ending theme of the anime TV series Jibaku-kun). Rhythm Formula is the duo's first double album, with the second disc featuring variations of the duo's side projects and covers of Yellow Magic Orchestra's "Technopolis", Mariko Nagai's "Keep on 'Keeping On'", and Yuji Ohno's "Theme from Lupin the Third". "Truth (Duet with Conan)" is a hidden track on disc 2, with vocalist Minami Takayama singing as Conan Edogawa.

The album peaked at No. 18 on Oricon's weekly albums chart.

Track listing 
All lyrics are written by Shiina Nagano; all music is composed by Minami Takayama, except where indicated; all music is arranged by Two-Mix.

Charts

References

External links 
 
 

1999 albums
Two-Mix albums
Japanese-language albums
Warner Music Japan albums